Textrix is a genus of funnel weavers first described by Carl Jakob Sundevall in 1833. They have a mainly European distribution, with one species in Ethiopia. The type species of the genus is Textrix denticulata.

The spiders in the genus Textrix have a strongly recurved posterior row of eyes with the medial eyes larger than the lateral eyes. They have a narrow head which is distinct from the thorax. These spiders may resemble wolf spiders as they are often recorded running about in sunshine, but their long and segmented posterior spinners are very marked and identify them as funnel web weavers.

Species
 it contains seven species:
Textrix caudata L. Koch, 1872 – Macaronesia, Northern Africa, Southern Europe, Syria
Textrix chyzeri de Blauwe, 1980 – Hungary, Croatia, Bosnia and Herzegovina, Montenegro, Bulgaria
Textrix denticulata (Olivier, 1789) (type) – Europe, Turkey
Textrix intermedia Wunderlich, 2008 – France
Textrix nigromarginata Strand, 1906 – Ethiopia
Textrix pinicola Simon, 1875 – Portugal to Italy
Textrix rubrofoliata Pesarini, 1990 – Italy (Sicily)

References

Agelenidae
Araneomorphae genera